Woh To Hai Albelaa is an Indian Hindi-language television drama series that premiered on 14 March 2022. It is airs on Star Bharat and streams on Disney+ Hotstar. Produced by Rajan Shahi under Director Kut's Productions, it stars Shaheer Sheikh and Hiba Nawab. It is an official adaptation of Star Vijay's Tamil series Eeramana Rojave.

Plot
Balwant Sharma and Dhanraj Choudhary are neighbors and best friends like their wives Indrani and Saroj. However, due to a fight between their children Krishna and Sayuri, both the families become enemies. Saroj thinks Balwant used Dhanraj only for his business. Balwant denies so and asks what Saroj wants. She demands half of his business, due to which Indrani and Saroj get into a confrontation. Indrani slaps and insults Saroj. Balwant later dies due to his deteriorating health.

18 years later
Saroj is not able to accept Indrani and her family members and hate them for the insult. Sharma's eldest daughter Sayuri is a professor and she hates Krishna (Kanha) because she holds him responsible for all the hatred among the two families. Sayuri and Choudhary's eldest son, Chiranjeev (Chiru) loves each other and wants to get married. They convince their family members, especially Saroj. The wedding preparations start but unfortunately Chiru meets with an accident and dies on the day of his wedding. Saroj blames Sayuri and considers her as a bad luck for her family. Meanwhile, Kanha marries Sayuri in order to fulfill the promise he made to Chiru. Both Kanha and Sayuri are unable to accept each other and Saroj does not accept Sayuri as her daughter-in-law. Kanha's former love, Anjali tries to create problems between Kanha and Sayuri because she wants to marry him. Kanha and Sayuri becomes friends and starts to admire each other and later they realize their love for each other. Saroj is still not able to accept Sayuri. Sayuri later reveals her pregnancy, after which Saroj finally accepts Sayuri as her daughter-in-law.

Kanha's younger brother, Nakul and Sayuri's younger sister, Rashmi confess their love for each other. Saroj accepts the proposal, after which Nakul and Rashmi gets engaged. Rashmi starts feeling jealous about Sayuri's position in the household and start hating her. Saroj accepts a marriage proposal of Rishi for Kusum, Rishi tortures and abuses her. After Sayuri and Kanha finds out the truth, they sent Rishi to jail. Rishi runs from the jail and kidnaps Kusum. Sayuri takes the responsibility and goes to save Kusum from Rishi, who attacks her. Unfortunately, Sayuri suffers a miscarriage. Sayuri's friend Yash and Kusum falls in love with each other. Later, Yash and Kusum and Nakul and Rashmi gets married. Rashmi reveals to Sayuri that she can't bear a baby, in order to create problems between Kanha and Sayuri, later Sayuri exposes Rashmi, after which she decides to get rid of Sayuri. When Sayuri, Kanha, Nakul, Rashmi, Yash and Kusum go for their family diety worship, Rashmi pushes Sayuri off the cliff, killing her.

1 year later
After a year, Rashmi has several nightmare due to the incident and has given birth to her and Nakul's child. Kanha is still not able to accept Sayuri's death and his relation with Nakul has suffered. On his way, Kanha meets with an accident, after which Dr. Vikrant saves him. He sees Vikrant's wife Sanchi, who is Sayuri's lookalike with their daughter Komal. He assumes Saachi to be Sayuri and gets delighted. Saachi is in fact Sayuri and she doesn't tell Kanha the truth because her and Kahna's daughter is with Vikrant. Vikrant blackmails Sayuri that if she says anything to Kanha he will harm her daughter. Meanwhile Kanha decides to find the truth and bring Sayuri back home.Rashmi is shocked to learn that Sayuri is alive and is having a baby.

Cast

Main
Shaheer Sheikh as Krishna "Kanha" Choudhary: Saroj and Dhanraj's son; Chiranjeev and Nakul's brother; Kusum's half-brother; Sayuri's husband; Kiara father and Kuku's adoptive father (2022–present)
Hiba Nawab as Sayuri "Sayu" Sharma Choudhary: Indrani and Balwant's daughter; Rashmi and Priya's sister; Krishna's wife; kiara's mother and Kuku's adoptive mother (2022–present)
 Fake Sanchi Desai: Vikrant's fake wife; Komal's fake mother (2022–2023)

Recurring
 Kinshuk Vaidya as Nakul Choudhary – Saroj and Dhanraj's youngest son; Chiranjeev and Krishna's brother; Kusum's half-brother; Rashmi's husband; Arjun's father (2022–present)
 Rachi Sharma/ Dharti Bhatt as Rashmi "Rashu" Sharma Choudhary – Indrani and Balwant's second daughter; Sayuri and Priya's sister; Nakul's wife; Arjun's mother (2022)/ (2022–present) 
Sucheta Khanna as Indrani Sharma – Balwant's wife; Sayuri, Rashmi and Priya's mother; Mithu and Arjun's grandmother (2022–present) 
Pallavi Pradhan as Saroj Choudhary – Dhanraj's second wife; Chiranjeev, Krishna and Nakul's mother; Kusum's step-mother; Mithu and Arjun's grandmother (2022–present) 
 Suruchi Adarkar as Kusum Choudhary Jindal – Sakshi and Dhanraj's daughter; Saroj's step-daughter; Chiranjeev, Krishna and Nakul's half-sister; Rishi's ex-wife; Yash's wife (2022–present)
Khushwant Walia as Yash Jindal – Sayuri's best friend; Krishna's business partner; Kusum's second husband (2022–present)
Mehul Buch as Dhanraj Choudhary – Tejendra's son; Sakshi's widower; Saroj's husband; Kusum, Chiranjeev, Krishna and Nakul's father; Mithu and Arjun's grandfather (2022–present) 
Nayan Bhatt as Bhanumati Sharma – Balwant's mother; Sayuri, Rashmi and Priya's grandmother (2022–present)
Somesh Agarwal as Tejendra Choudhary – Dhanraj's father; Kusum, Chiranjeev, Krishna and Nakul's grandfather (2022–present)
 Hazel Shah as Komal "Kukku" Desai Chaudhary - Vikrant and Sanchi's daughter; Krishna and Sayuri's adoptive daughter; Mithu's adoptive sister (2022–present) 
 Prerna Mehta as Mithu Chaudhary - Krishna and Sayuri's daughter; Komal's  adoptive sister (2023–present) 
 Deven Jain as Arjun Chaudhary - Nakul and Rashmi's son (2023–present)
 Priyamvada Kant as Chaman Bahar (2023–present) 
 Sujata Vaishnav as Archana Chaudhary - Saroj and Indrani's aunt-in-law; Chiranjeev, Krishna and Nakul's maternal grandmother (2022–present)
 Karan Veer Mehra as Dr. Vikrant Desai - Sanchi's husband; Komal's father; Sayuri's fake husband (2022–2023)
 Vaishnavi Ganatra as Priya "Pia" Sharma – Indrani and Balwant's youngest daughter; Sayuri and Rashmi's sister (2022)
 Anuj Sachdeva as Chiranjeev "Chiru" Choudhary – Saroj and Dhanraj's eldest son; Krishna and Nakul's brother; Kusum's half-brother; Sayuri's ex-fiancé (2022) 
 Sachin Tyagi as Balwant Sharma – Bhanumati's son; Indrani's husband; Sayuri, Rashmi and Priya's father (2022)
 Aparna Dixit as Anjali Malhotra – Roma and Amitabh's daughter; Krishna's ex-girlfriend turned obsessive lover (2022)
 Manish Chawla as Rishi – Kusum's first husband (2022)
 Arup Pal as Amitabh Malhotra – Roma's husband; Anjali's father (2022)
 Sanjana Phadke as Roma Malhotra – Amitabh's wife; Anjali's mother (2022)
 Monu Khanojiya as Tingu (2023–present)

Production

Development
The series is produced by Rajan Shahi under the Director Kut's Productions. Woh Toh Hai Albelaa officially started with a puja on the sets.

For a song sequence, Kanha, portrayed by Sheikh recreated Johnny Depp's Captain Jack Sparrow from Pirates of the Caribbean.

Casting
Shaheer Sheikh was cast to portray the lead, Krishna. It marks his second collaboration with Rajan Shahi post Yeh Rishtey Hain Pyaar Ke. He said, "I am very happy to work with Rajan Shahi sir once again. Krishna's character is very cool, allowing me to explore Shaheer Sheikh in reel life too and add my own interpretations to the character." Hiba Nawab was cast as Sayuri, opposite Sheikh. It is her second collaboration with Rajan Shahi after Tere Sheher Mein.

Kinshuk Vaidya and Rachi Sharma were cast as Krishna's brother Nakul and Sayuri's sister Rashmi respectively. It marks Sharma's acting debut. Anuj Sachdeva was cast as the eldest brother, Chiru. His role ended in May 2022. Suruchi Adarkar was cast as the eldest sister Kusum, marking her Hindi TV debut.

In December 2022, Dharti Bhatt replaced Rachi Sharma as Rashmi Sharma Choudhary, who left the show as she did not wanted to play a mother onscreen.

Filming
The series is set in Agra, Uttar Pradesh. It is mainly shot at the Film City, Mumbai. Some initial sequences, including a song were shot at Ramoji Film City in Hyderabad.

Release
The series promos were released in February 2022. Woh Toh Hai Albelaa premiered on 14 March 2022 on Star Bharat.

Soundtrack

Woh Toh Hai Albelaa soundtrack is composed by Nakash Aziz and Sargam Jassu. The first song "Woh Toh Hai Albelaa" is inspired from 1994 film Kabhi Haan Kabhi Naa's song of the same name. It is the theme song of Kanha. The second song "Ho Rabba" is the theme song of Kanha and Sayuri.

Awards and nominations

See also
List of programs broadcast by Star Bharat

References

External links
 
 Woh Toh Hai Albelaa on Disney+ Hotstar

Hindi-language television shows
2022 Indian television series debuts
Indian television soap operas
Indian drama television series
Star Bharat original programming
Hindi-language television series based on Tamil-language television series